Dry Canyon Reservoir is a small reservoir formed by an embankment dam on Dry Canyon Creek in the foothills of the Sierra Pelona Mountains of northern Los Angeles County, California, just north of the city of Santa Clarita. It was designed as a part of the Los Angeles Aqueduct system.

History

The incoming water from San Francisquito came from Tunnel 77 and the outgoing water went out Tunnel 78. Water from the lake was distributed via the Los Angeles Aqueduct to the northern portion of the Greater Los Angeles Area.

Draining the Reservoir
Following damages incurred by the dam itself during the 1952 Kern County earthquake and growing concerns over its structural integrity, the reservoir was drained in 1966. Since the early 1970s, efforts had been made to refill the reservoir but these plans have since been abandoned due to high costs. In the decades that followed, the suburban communities of Santa Clarita had grown northward to fill the narrow valley just downstream. The course of Dry Canyon Creek south of the reservoir was then funneled down a concrete wash to prevent flooding of the surrounding communities.

See also
List of dams and reservoirs in California
List of lakes in California
St. Francis Dam
Bouquet Reservoir
Castaic Lake
Dry Canyon Formation

References 

Reservoirs in Los Angeles County, California
Los Angeles Aqueduct
Sierra Pelona Ridge
Reservoirs in California
Reservoirs in Southern California
1912 establishments in California
Santa Clarita, California